Edison Pieter Rumaropen (born 13 November 1983 in Biak Numfor Regency, Papua, Indonesia) is an Indonesian former football player who last played for Persiwa Wamena. His position was striker and midfielder.

During a league match against Pelita Bandung Raya on 21 April 2013, Rumaropen assaulted the referee, punching him in the face after he had awarded a penalty against Persiwa Wamena. The official left the field, bleeding from his torn lower lip, and Rumaropen was given a red card. As a result of the assault Rumaropen was banned for life by PSSI, the Football Association of Indonesia.

Despite the life ban, Ruparopen still played for Persiwa Wamena on Premier League after getting relegated from Super League that year. He had a son, Diego Rumaropen, member of Indonesian National Police which was killed by TPNPB.

References

External links
 Profile at goal.com
 Profile at liga-indonesia.co.id

Indonesian footballers
1983 births
Living people
People from Biak Numfor Regency
Violence in sports
Persiwa Wamena players
Liga 1 (Indonesia) players
Association football fullbacks
Association football wingers
Sportspeople from Papua